The Chinese Library Classification (CLC), also known as Classification for Chinese Libraries (CCL), is effectively the national library classification scheme in China. It is used in almost all primary and secondary schools, universities, academic institutions, as well as public libraries. It is also used by publishers to classify all books published in China.

The Book Classification of Chinese Libraries (BCCL) was first published in 1975, under the auspices of China's Administrative Bureau of Cultural Affairs. Its fourth edition (1999) was renamed CLC. In September 2010, the fifth edition was published by National Library of China Publishing House.
CLC has twenty-two top-level categories, and inherits a Marxist orientation from its earlier editions. (For instance, category A is Marxism, Leninism, Maoism & Deng Xiaoping Theory.) It contains a total of 43600 categories, many of which are recent additions, meeting the needs of a rapidly changing nation.

The CLC system
The 22 top categories and selected sub-categories of CLC (5th Edition) are as follows:

A. Marxism, Leninism, Maoism and Deng Xiaoping theory
 A1 The works of Karl Marx and Friedrich Engels
 A2 The works of Vladimir Lenin
 A3 The works of Joseph Stalin
 A4 The works of Mao Zedong
 A49 The works of Deng Xiaoping
 A5 The symposium/collection of Marx, Engels, Lenin, Stalin, Mao and Deng Xiaoping
 A7 The biobibliography and biography of Marx, Engels, Lenin, Stalin, Mao and Deng Xiaoping
 A8 Study and research of Marxism, Leninism, Maoism and Deng Xiaoping theory

B. Philosophy and religions
 B-4 Education and dissemination of philosophy
 B-49 Learners' book and popular literature of philosophy
 B0 theory of philosophy
 B0-0 Marxist philosophy
 B01 Basic problems of philosophy
 B014 Object, purpose and method of philosophy
 B015 Materialism and idealism
 B016 Ontology
 B016.8 Cosmology
 B016.9 Time-space-theory
 B017 Epistemology
 B017.8 Determinism and indeterminism
 B017.9 Self theory
 B018 Axiology
 B019.1 Materialism
 B019.11 Naive materialism
 B019.12 Metaphysical materialism
 B019.13 Dialectical materialism
 B019.2 Idealism
 B02 Dialectical materialism
 B024 Materialist dialectics
 B025 Categories of materialist dialectics
 B026 Methodology
 B027 Application of dialectical materialism
 B028 Natural philosophy
 B029 Dialectics of nature
 B03 Historical materialism
 B031 Social material requirements of life
 B032 Basic social conflict
 B032.1 Productive forces und relations of production
 B032.2 Base and superstructure
 B033 Class theory
 B034 Theory of revolution
 B035 Theory of country
 B036 Social being and social consciousness
 B037 Contradictions among the people
 B038 Role of the people in historical development
 B08 Philosophical schools and research
 B081 Idealism
 B081.1 Metaphysics
 B081.2 Epistemology of idealism, apriorism
 B082 Positivism, Machism
 B083 Voluntarism and philosophy of life
 B084 Neo-Kantianism and Neohegelianism
 B085 Neorealism, logical positivism (new positivism, logical empiricism)
 B086 Existentialism (survivalism)
 B087 Pragmatism
 B088 Neo-Thomism (new scholasticism)
 B089 Other philosophical schools
 B089.1 Western Marxism
 B089.2 Philosophical hermeneutics
 B089.3 Philosophical anthropology
 B1 Philosophy (worldwide)
 B2 Philosophy in China
 B22 Pre-Qin Dynasty philosophy (~before 220 BC)
 B222 The Confucian School
 B222.2 Confucius (Kǒng Qiū, 551-479 BC)
 B3 Philosophy in Asia
 B4 Philosophy in Africa
 B5 Philosophy in Europe
 B6 Philosophy in Australasia
 B7 Philosophy in America
 B8 Cognitive science
 B9 Religions
 B91 Sociology of religion, religion and science
 B92 Philosophy and history of religion
 B93 Mythology and primitive religion
 B94 Buddhism
 B95 Taoism
 B96 Islam
 B97 Christianity
 B971 Bible
 B971.1 Old Testament
 B971.2 New Testament
 B972 Doctrine, theology
 B975 Evangelism, sermons
 B976 Christian denominations
 B976.1 Roman Catholic Church
 B976.2 Orthodox Christianity (Eastern Orthodoxy, Oriental Orthodoxy)
 B976.3 Protestantism (Protestant Reformation)
 B977 Ecclesiastical polity
 B978 Research on Christianity
 B979 History of Christianity
 B979.9 Biography
 B98 Other religions
 B99 Augury, superstition

C. Social sciences
 C0 Social scientific theory and methodology
 C1 Present and future of social sciences
 C2 Organisations, groups, conferences
 C3 Method of research in social sciences
 C4 Education and popularization of social sciences
 C5 Serials, anthologies, periodicals in social sciences
 C6 Reference materials in social sciences
 C7 (no longer used)
 C8 Statistics in social sciences
 C9 Sociology

D. Politics and law
 D0 Political theory
 D1 International campaign of Communism
 D2 Communist Party of China
 D3 Communist parties of other countries
 D4 Labor, peasant, youth, female organizations and movements
 D5 Politics (worldwide)
 D6 Politics in China
 D7 Politics in individual countries
 D8 Diplomacy, international relations
 D9 Law
 DF Law (Applications of laws)

E. Military science
 E0 Military theory
 E1 Military (worldwide)
 E2 Military in China
 E3 Military in Asia
 E4 Military in Africa
 E5 Military in Europe
 E6 Military in Australasia
 E7 Military in America
 E8 Strategies, tactics, and battles
 E9 Military technology

F. Economics
 F0 Economics
 F1 Economics, economic history and economic geography of individual countries
 F2 Economic planning and management
 F3 Agricultural economics
 F4 Industrial economics
 F5 Economics of transport
 F6 Economics of postal and cable services
 F7 Economics of commerce
 F8 Finance and banking

G. Culture, science, education and sports
 G0 Philosophy of culture
 G1 Culture
 G2 Knowledge transmission
 G3 Science, scientific research
 G4 Education
 G5 Education in individual countries
 G6 Education (primary, secondary, tertiary)
 G7 Education (specialized)
 G8 Sports

H. Languages and linguistics
 H0 Linguistics
 H01 Phonetics
 H019 Method of recitation, oratory of speech
 H02 Grammatology
 H03 Semantics, lexicology and meaning of words
 H033 Idiom
 H034 Adage
 H04 Syntax
 H05 Study of writing, rhetoric
 H059 Study of translation
 H06 Lexicography
 H061 Dictionaries
 H1 Chinese language
 H10
 H102 Regulation, standardisation of Chinese language, promotion of Putonghua
 H109
 H109.2 Ancient Chinese language
 H109.4 Modern Chinese language
 H11 Phone (historical Chinese phonology)
 H12 Grammatology
 H2  Languages of China's ethnic minorities
 H3 Commonly used foreign languages
 H31 English language
 H32 French language
 H33 German language
 H34 Spanish language
 H35 Russian language
 H36 Japanese language
 H37 Arabic language
 H4 Family of Sino-Tibetan languages (China, Tibet and Burma)
 H5 Family of Altaic languages (Turkic, Mongolian and Tungusic)
 H6 Language families in other areas of the world
 H61 Austroasiatic languages and Tai languages (Mainland Southeast Asia))
 H62 Dravidian languages (South India)
 H63 Austronesian languages (Malayo-Polynesian)
 H64 Paleosiberian languages (Siberia)
 H65 Ibero-Caucasian languages (Caucasus Mountains)
 H66 Uralic languages
 H67 Afroasiatic languages (Southwest Asia, Arabian Peninsula, North Africa)
 H7 Indo-European languages
 H8 Language families on other continents
 H81 African languages
 H83 American languages
 H84 Papuan languages
 H9 International auxiliary languages (Interlingua, Ido, Esperanto, etc.)

I. Literature
 I0 Literary theory
 I1 Literature (worldwide)
 I2 Literature in China
 I3 Literature in Asia
 I4 Literature in Africa
 I5 Literature in Europe
 I6 Literature in Australasia
 I7 Literature in America

J. Art
 J0 Theory of fine art
 J1 Fine art of the world
 J2 Painting
 J3 Sculpture
 J4 Photography
 J5 Applied arts
 J6 Music
 J7 Dance
 J8 Drama
 J9 Cinematography, television

K. History and geography
 K0 Historical theory
 K1 Human history
 K2 History of China
 K3 History of Asia
 K4 History of Africa
 K5 History of Europe
 K6 History of Australasia
 K7 History of America
 K8 Biography, archaeology
 K9 Geography

N. Natural science
 N0 Theory and methodology
 N1 Present state
 N2 Organisations, groups, conferences
 N3 Research methodology
 N4 Education and popularization
 N5 Serials, anthologies, periodicals
 N6 Reference materials
 N8 Field surveys
 N9 Minor sciences

O. Mathematics, physics and chemistry
 O1 Mathematics
 O2 Applied mathematics
 O3 Mechanics
 O4 Physics
 O6 Chemistry
 O7 Crystallography

P. Astronomy and geoscience
 P1 Astronomy
 P2 Geodesy
 P3 Geophysics
 P4 Meteorology
 P5 Geology
 P6 Mineralogy
 P7 Oceanography
 P9 Physiography

Q. Life sciences
 Q1 General biology
 Q2 Cytology
 Q3 Genetics
 Q4 Physiology
 Q5 Biochemistry
 Q6 Biophysics
 Q7 Molecular biology
 Q8 Bioengineering
 Q9 Zoology and botany

R. Medicine and health sciences
 R1 Preventive medicine, public health
 R2 Traditional Chinese medicine
 R3 Human anatomy, physiology, pathology, microbiology, parasitology
 R4 Clinical medicine
 R5 Internal medicine
 R6 Surgery
 R7 Medical specialties
 R71 Obstetrics, gynecology
 R72 Pediatrics
 R73 Oncology
 R74 Neurology, psychiatry
 R75 Dermatology, venereology
 R76 Otolaryngology
 R77 Ophthalmology
 R78 Dentistry
 R79 Non-Chinese traditional medicine
 R8 Radiology, sport medicine, diving medicine, aerospace medicine
 R9 Pharmacology, pharmacy

S. Agricultural science
 S1 Fundamental agricultural science
 S2 Agricultural engineering
 S3 Agronomy
 S4 Phytopathology
 S5 Individual crops
 S6 Horticulture
 S7 Forestry
 S8 Animal husbandry, veterinary medicine, hunting, sericulture, apiculture
 S9 Aquaculture, fishery

T. Industrial technology
 TB General industrial technology
 TD Mining engineering
 TE Petroleum, natural gas
 TF Extractive metallurgy, smelting
 TG Metallurgy, metalworking
 TH Machinery, instrumentation
 TJ Military technology
 TK Power plant
 TL Nuclear technology
 TM Electrical engineering
 TN Electronic engineering, telecommunication engineering
 TP Automation, computer engineering
 TQ Chemical engineering
 TS Light industry, handicraft
 TU Construction engineering
 TV Water resources, hydraulic engineering

U. Transportation
 U1 General transport
 U2 Railway transport
 U4 Highway transport
 U6 Marine transport

V. Aviation and Aerospace
 V1 Research and Exploration of Aviation and Aerospace Technology
 V2 Aviation
 V4 Aerospace (Spaceflight)
 V7 Aerospace Medicine

X. Environmental science
 X1 Fundamental environmental science
 X2 Environmental research
 X3 Environmental protection and management
 X4 Disaster protection
 X5 Pollution control
 X7 Waste Management and recycling
 X8 Environmental quality monitoring
 X9 Occupational safety and health

Z. General works
 Z1 Collectanea/generalia (book series)
 Z12 Collectanea of China
 Z121 General collectanea
 Z121.2 Song Dynasty
 Z121.3 Yuan Dynasty
 Z121.4 Ming Dynasty
 Z121.5 Qing Dynasty
 Z121.6 Republic period
 Z121.7 Modern
 Z122 Collectanea of a particular locality
 Z123 Collectanea by members of a particular family
 Z124 Collectanea by individual writers
 Z125 Collectanea of lost books
 Z126 Collectanea of Chinese classics
 Z126.1 Collection of Confucian classics
 Z126.2 Collection of treatises
 Z126.21 General collection
 Z126.22 Remake of lost books
 Z126.23 Collection of a particular theme
 Z126.24 Chronological tables, tablets, illustrated works
 Z126.25 Works on phonetics, semantics and authenticity
 Z126.27 Research, critics and proves
 Z13 Collectanea and book series of Asia
 Z14 Book series of Africa
 Z15 Book series of Europe
 Z16 Book series of Oceania
 Z17 Book series of America
 Z2 Encyclopedias and Chinese encyclopedias (Leishu)
 Z22 Chinese encyclopedias
 Z221 Tang Dynasty
 Z222 Song Dynasty
 Z223 Yuan Dynasty
 Z224 Ming Dynasty
 Z225 Qing Dynasty
 Z226 Republic
 Z227 Modern
 Z228 General popular literature
 Z228.1 Children's books
 Z228.2 Popular youth books
 Z228.3 Elders' books
 Z228.4 Women's readers
 Z228.5 Men's readers
 Z23 Encyclopedias of Asia
 Z24 Encyclopedias of Africa
 Z25 Encyclopedias of Europe
 Z26 Encyclopedias of Oceania
 Z27 Encyclopedias of America
 Z28 Encyclopedias of a particular field
 Z3 Dictionaries
 Z4 Symposia, anthologies, selected works, essays
 Z5 Almanac
 Z6 Serials, periodicals
 Z8 Catalogues, abstracts, indexes

Other classifications 
The other library classifications in China are:

 Library Classification of the People’s University of China (LCPUC)
 Library Classification of the Chinese Academy of Sciences (LCCAS)
 Library Classification for Medium and Small Libraries (MSL)
 Library Classification of Wuhan University (LCWU)

The other library classifications for Chinese materials outside mainland China are:
 Cambridge University Library Chinese Classification System, Classification Scheme for Chinese Books devised by Profs. Haloun and P. van der Loon for Cambridge University, UK.
 University of Leeds Classification of Books in Chinese, UK (36 pages of Catalog in PDF)
 Harvard-Yenching Classification System
 New Classification Scheme for Chinese Libraries (commonly used in Taiwan, Hong Kong and Macau)

See also 
 Libraries in the People's Republic of China

References

External links 
 Official website 
 Contemporary Classification Systems and Thesauri in China, Zhang Qiyu, Liu Xiangsheng, Wang Dongbo, 62nd IFLA General Conference - Conference Proceedings - August 25-31, 1996
 Chinese Library Classification Editorial Board
 Abridged third (obsolete) edition of CLC 
 CLC Online 
 Research on Interoperability of Metadata in Classification Schemes-construction of automatic mapping system between CLC and DDC, Jianbo Dai, Hanqing Hou, Ling Cao, Dept. of Libr. & Inform. Sci., Nanjing Agri. Univ., Nanjing, China 210095
 Construction of Knowledge Base for Automatic Indexing and Classification based on CLC, Hanqing Hou, Chunxiang Xue, Nanjing Agri. Univ., Nanjing, China 210095
 An Intelligent Retrieval System for Chinese Agricultural Literature indexed by Chinese Classification System, Ping Qian, Xiaolu Su, Chinese Academy of Agricultural Sciences, China
 East Asian Library Classification Systems, archived
 The Development of Authority Database in National Library of China (NLC), March 2002, Beixin Sun of NLC NLC's classification subject thesaurus database based on CLC.
 National Bibliographies: the Chinese Experience, 72nd IFLA Conference at Seoul in Korea, August 2006, Ben Gu of NLC An overview of the current situation of the National Bibliography and classification systems in China.
 A month at the Shanghai Library, November 2004, Helen Michael, University of Toronto A librarian from Canada shared her experience of working in a library of China.

1975 introductions
1975 establishments in China
Library cataloging and classification
Knowledge representation
Chinese culture